"Reaction" is a song by American R&B singer Rebbie Jackson and the title track from her album of the same name, released as a single in 1986. The single peaked at number fifteen on the Billboard dance chart and number sixteen on the Billboard R&B chart. The single was released on a 12" format, including an extended dance mix, radio edit, and dub. The single was also released in a 7" format, including a radio edit and instrumental version.

Chart information

1986 singles
Rebbie Jackson songs
1986 songs
Columbia Records singles
Songs written by David Conley (musician)